The 2016 Women's Four Nations Cup was the sixth Hockey Four Nations Cup, an international women's field hockey tournament, consisting of a series of test matches. It was held in Germany, from June 9 to 12, 2016, and featured four of the top nations in women's field hockey.

Competition format
The tournament featured the national teams of Argentina, China, South Korea, and the hosts, Germany, competing in a round-robin format, with each team playing each other once. Three points were awarded for a win, one for a draw, and none for a loss.

Results

Matches

Statistics

Goalscorers
2 Goals

  Carla Rebecchi 

1 Goal

  Gabriela Aguirre 
  Noel Barrionuevo
  María José Granatto
  Delfina Merino
  Zhang Jinrong
  Sun Xiao
  Charlotte Stapenhorst 
  Nike Lorenz 
  Marie Mävers 
  Julia Müller 
  Lisa Schütze 
  Jang Hee-sun

References

2016
2016 in women's field hockey
field hockey
field hockey
field hockey
field hockey